Bihl is a surname. Notable people with the surname include:

Agnès Bihl (born 1974), French singer
Staif Bihl, member of the Eths, French Metalcore band 
Thomas Bihl (born 1975), German poker player

See also
Bill (surname)